Jakov Labura (16 July 1927 – 12 August 2012) was a Croatian rower. He competed in the men's coxed four event at the 1948 Summer Olympics.

References

1927 births
2012 deaths
Croatian male rowers
Olympic rowers of Croatia
Rowers at the 1948 Summer Olympics
Sportspeople from Šibenik